La Libertad is a municipality in the Chontales Department of Nicaragua.

It is the birthplace of President Daniel Ortega, Cardinal Miguel Obando y Bravo, and Vice President Omar Halleslevens. It has a population of 11,429 people.

 https://en.db-city.com/en.db-city.com--Nicaragua--Chontales--La-Libertad

References

Municipalities of the Chontales Department